Yara Gambirasio  (21 May 1997 – 26 November 2010) was a 13-year-old Italian girl killed on the evening of 26 November 2010.

Murder and case development 
At 6:44 PM on 26 November 2010, Yara Gambirasio left the Brembate di Sopra, Italy sport center alone, but never reached her home 700 meters away. Her family soon called the Carabinieri, but despite a search involving hundreds of volunteers, her body was not found until 26 February 2011 in Chignolo d'Isola, 10 kilometers from Brembate di Sopra. The body showed multiple superficial cuts, possibly made by a pointed object such as a nail or a knife, and a large wound on the head. In August 2011 a final autopsy report had not yet been released and not even the exact cause of death had been ascertained, but leaked details from the investigation suggested that the death was caused by the combination of a head blow (as from falling on a hard surface or being hit with a stone), at least six cut wounds (none deadly) and hypothermia. It did not appear that Gambirasio had been raped. Yara's funeral took place on 28 May 2011 and was presided over by the bishop of Bergamo Francesco Beschi.
The first suspect was a young Moroccan man who was arrested after a comment he made was mistranslated but then quickly exonerated. After a trace of genetic material was taken from the victim's underwear and leggings, forensic scientists analyzed and compared about 22,000 DNA profiles and the search began for a suspect with matching DNA, referred to as "Ignoto 1" (Unknown 1, the identifying nickname given by investigators to the murderer of Gambirasio). On 16 June 2014 an Italian bricklayer living and working in the area, Massimo Giuseppe Bossetti, was arrested and accused of being the murderer, mainly by virtue of his DNA matching "Ignoto 1"'s. While the deceased father of "Ignoto 1",  Giuseppe Guerinoni, who had died in 1999, was identified relatively quickly, the search for the actual suspect was much longer and complicated because he was an illegitimate son of Guerinoni - a circumstance apparently totally unknown to anyone else previously; the suspect only became the target of investigations after his mother was tested for DNA and the tests showed it likely that the suspect was one of her sons. Because the investigators wanted to observe the suspect for several months before confronting him, the DNA match of Massimo Giuseppe Bossetti with that of "Ignoto 1" was confirmed during an apparently routine breathalyzer test, which was performed specifically with the intention of obtaining Bossetti's DNA.

Bossetti proclaimed his innocence right from the arrest (stating that he suffered from epistaxis and that someone had stolen his work tools, including a knife, an awl and a trowel, possibly blood-soiled for this reason, and that the DNA proof was fabricated, due to either excessive exposure to the weather or cross-contamination), but police maintained that the sample was "of excellent quality" and Bossetti was denied any chance of a plea bargain or confession, despite his charge of life imprisonment. His wife confirmed his alibi, but she was not believed, also based on some phone recordings.

In January 2015, a scientific adviser to the court stated that the MtDNA of "Ignoto 1" might not match that of Bossetti, and that there might be the possibility of an error. According to rumors, as early as July 2013, the DNA showed no correspondence with the genetic maternal line of Massimo Bossetti (a fact explained with a comparison error among thousands of samples), while that correspondence was found after a further analysis on the illegitimate child - after the suggestion of an acquaintance - of Ester Arzuffi (the mother of the suspect). If Bossetti appears to be Guerinoni's son, there are still doubts even on the nuclear DNA and its correspondence with the profile of the suspect. The attorney refused, however, to question the evidence, as requested by the lawyers of Bossetti, who have repeated several times the request for release of their client, and asked to declare him not guilty in a future trial. Bossetti's lawyer said that «there is an obvious anomaly, the mitochondrial DNA does not match the nuclear DNA. This should at least make us raise a question: whether the whole process which led to the identification of DNA has been done with the most absolute correctness, or not».

An instructor at the gym, Silvia Brena, has been the focus of attention of Bossetti's defence. Her blood was found on the sleeves of Yara's jacket, identified by DNA. On the night of Yara's disappearance, Silvia Brena's father has said that she cried all night, although she has given no reason for this. Under questioning she said that she remembered nothing and could not explain why she and her brother had sent text messages to each other at the time of Yara's disappearance which they had almost immediately deleted without deleting other messages sent before and after.

On 1 July 2016 the Corte d'Assise of Bergamo sentenced Bossetti to life imprisonment. In July 2017 the Corte d'Assise d'Appello di Brescia upheld the verdict. On 12 October 2018 the Court of Cassation confirmed Bossetti's life sentence.

In November 2019, Bossetti's defence lawyers asked for a review of the DNA evidence. In March 2021 their request wasn't accepted because there wasn’t any more DNA to be analysed.

This led, in December 2022, to an investigation on pm Letizia Ruggeri accused of misdirection and trial fraud.

See also
List of solved missing person cases

References

Further information 

Unknown Male Number 1, documentary about the case
Yara (2021), a Netflix film

External links
New York Times: In Search for Killer, DNA Sweep Exposes Intimate Family Secrets in Italy, 27 July 2014
 The Guardian: The murder that has obsessed Italy, 8 January 2015
Casefile True Crime Podcast - Case 47: Yara Gambirasio - 25 February 2017

2010s missing person cases
2010 murders in Italy
21st century in Lombardy
Deaths by person in Italy
Female murder victims
Formerly missing people
Incidents of violence against girls
Missing person cases in Italy
Murdered Italian children
November 2010 crimes
People from the Province of Bergamo
People murdered in Lombardy